Čížkovice is a municipality and village in Litoměřice District in the Ústí nad Labem Region of the Czech Republic. It has about 1,500 inhabitants.

It is about 3.5 km southwest of Lovosice.

Administrative parts
The village of Želechovice is an administrative part of Čížkovice.

Notable people
Moritz Thausing (1838–1884), Austrian art historian

References

Villages in Litoměřice District